Anouar Abdul Kader (born 11 January 1953) is a Syrian football coach and former player who played as a midfielder. He competed in the 1980 Summer Olympics.

Managerial career 
In June 2017, Abdul Kader was appointed head coach of Al-Shorta.

References

External links
 

1953 births
Living people
Syrian footballers
Association football midfielders
Al-Fotuwa SC players
Al-Shorta Damascus players
Syrian Premier League players
Syria international footballers
Olympic footballers of Syria
Footballers at the 1980 Summer Olympics
Syrian football managers
Al-Fotuwa SC managers
Al-Baqa'a Club managers
Taliya SC managers
Al-Shorta Damascus managers
Syrian expatriate football managers
Syrian expatriate sportspeople in Jordan
Expatriate football managers in Jordan